Valikhnovski Rostyslav Liubomyrovych (Ukrainian: born February 24, 1973, Ivano-Frankivsk, Ukraine) — priest of the Ukrainian Orthodox Church, Deputy Head of the State Administration of the President of Ukraine (2008-2010), Advisor to the Minister of Emergencies of Ukraine, Head of the Department of Emergency Medicine and on the Implementation of the "112" system of the Ministry of Emergencies of Ukraine (2010-2012), Honored Doctor of Ukraine, Candidate of Medical Sciences, surgeon, personal doctor of the President of Ukraine Viktor Yushchenko since 2005.

Director and founder of the Medical Center "Doctor Valikhnovsky Clinic".

Biography 
Rostyslav Valikhnovski was born in a family of doctors on February 24, 1973.

In 1990, he graduated with honors from school number 1 in the city of Turiisk in Volyn oblast and entered the Ternopil National Medical University, the Faculty of General Medicine, which he graduated with honors. After graduating from the university he studied in Canada.

From 1997 to 1998, he passed an internship in general surgery at the National Institute of Surgery and Transplantology named after A. Shalimov.

From 2005 to 2006, he studied at the Institute of General and Emergency Surgery of the Academy of Medical Sciences of Ukraine in Kharkiv.

In 2006, he defended his Ph.D. on the topic: "Substantiation of the surgical/microsurgical method for treatment of various alopecia types" and received the scientific degree of Candidate of Medical Sciences (Surgery).

Valikhnovski trained in Intensive Care in Ottawa Civic Hospital (Canada), as well as in Plastic and Reconstructive Surgery at the HFI Clinic in Toronto (Canada).

Career 
In 1998, Rostyslav Valikhnovski founded the medical clinic "Valikhnovski Surgery Institute".

In 2004, Valikhnovski was selected to the team of doctors who saved Viktor Yushchenko after he was poisoned with dioxin, after which Rostyslav became the president's personal doctor.

From 2008 to 2010, he served as Deputy Head of the State Administration of the President of Ukraine.

From 2010 to 2012 he headed the Department of Emergency Medicine and the Creation and Implementation of the "112" emergency system of the Ministry of Emergencies of Ukraine.

Since 2012, Rostyslav managed the medical holding Valikhnovski M.D.

Projects

Collaboration with Harvard Medical School 
In 2019, Valikhnovski Surgery Institute teamed up with a group of American doctors from Massachusetts General Hospital to help operate on Ukrainian children diagnosed with a cleft lip and conduct joint research of this pathology.

Cooperation with Discovery TV channel 
Valikhnovski Surgery Institute has partnered with Discovery Channel BODY BIZARRE, a global medical television project. This show, which has been airing since 2013 in many countries of the world, tells the stories of people with rare disabilities and anomalies in appearance, who are operated on to improve their appearance by famous plastic surgeons around the world. Valikhnovski's team, in particular, cured a patient with a rare diagnosis of Madelung's syndrome.

"112" Emergency System 
In 2011, while working in the Ministry of Emergency Situations of Ukraine, Rostyslav oversaw the implementation of the emergency system "112", an analogue of the "9-1-1" service in the United States and headed a group of specialists who developed the law on the system "112" (draft Law of Ukraine on the system of emergency to the population on a single telephone number "112" No. 9074 dated 26.08.2011), which was adopted by the Verkhovna Rada of Ukraine.

In 2012, the 112 system operated in Kyiv, Donetsk, Kharkiv and Lviv regions during Euro 2012.

Viktor Yushchenko's treatment 
Rostyslav Valikhnovski from 2004 to 2010 was involved in accompanying treatment and face reconstruction of Viktor Yushchenko.

The organizer of the International Congress KGSC 
Kyiv Global Surgery Congress is the largest surgical congress in Ukraine. The congress participants are practicing surgeons from different countries of the world. In 2017, for the first time in Ukraine, a presentation of European protocols and standards of surgical care took place. Ukrainian surgeons presented their achievements in the field of military surgery.

Television participation 
Valikhnovski participates as a permanent expert on television programs: "Give me back my beauty" ("1+1"), "I am ashamed of my body" ("STB"), "My new life" and "Ukraine is speaking" ("Ukraine"), "It concerns everyone" ("Inter"). 

He also provides consultations and operations to the participants of the mentioned TV-projects.

Public activity 
Valikhnovski studied at the Kyiv Theological Seminary.

On May 22, 2019, Rostyslav was ordained a deacon in the Nicholas Cathedral of the Holy Intercession Monastery.

On August 19, 2020, Rostyslav Valikhnovski became a priest of the Ukrainian Orthodox Church.

Family 
Rostyslav’s wife, Kateryna Valikhnovska, is a surgeon, an assistant at the Department of Surgery and Transplantology of the National Institute of Surgery and Transplantology. The couple has the daughter Maria. 

His father, Liubomyr  Valikhnovski, is the chief surgeon of the city of Turiisk and an honored doctor of Ukraine. He has about 50 years of surgical experience and has performed more than 15,000 complex surgical procedures.

His mother, Maria Valikhnovska, is a chief therapist of the Turiisk district, Volyn Oblast.

His grandfather, Dmytro Semenovych, served in the church as a priest for 64 years.

His brother, Taras Valikhnovski, works as a chief physician and surgeon at the Valikhnovski Surgery Institute.

Awards 
"Person of the Year 2015" for the introduction of innovative technologies in medicine.

From 2016 to 2019, Valikhnovski Surgery Institute was the winner of the "Choice of the Year" competition in the category "Best Surgical Clinic of the Year".

Works
 Justification of the surgical-R.Valihnovsky microsurgical treatment of different types of alopecia. - Ph.D. thesis. - 2006.
 R.Valihnovsky Prognozuvannya rezultatіv mіkrotransplantatsії hair at androgenozalezhnіy alopetsії // Transplantologіya: magazine. - 2004. - T. 5. - No. 1.
 R.Valihnovsky Location hіrurgіchno-mіkrohіrurgіchnogo method in lіkuvannі rіznih tipіv alopetsії // Transplantologіya: magazine. - 2004. - T. 6. - No. 2.
 R.Valihnovsky Odnoetapna funktsіonalna estetichna rhinoplasty - ratsіonalnі pіdhodi to її realіzatsії // Reconstructive hіrurgіya: magazine. - 2004. - No. 2.
 R.Valihnovsky Osoblivostі hіrurgіchnoї tehnіki at mіkrotransplantatsії hair // Transplantologіya: magazine. - 2005. - T. 8. - No. 1.
 R.Fedosyuk, R.Valikhnovsky, V.Kniasevytch, O.Sorg, M.Zennegg, P.Schmid, J.Saurat First identіfіcation of hydroxylated dibenzodioxins and metabolites of TCDD in human (Eng.) // The International Investigative Dermatology: report. - Kyoto, Japan, in 2008, 14–17 May.
 O Sorg, M Zennegg, P Schmid, R Fedosyuk, R Valikhnovskyi, O Gaide, V Kniazevych, JH Saurat 2,3,7,8-tetrachlorodibenzo-p-dioxin (TCDD) poisoning in Victor Yushchenko: identification and measurement of TCDD metabolites (Eng.) // The Lancet: report. - London, UK, 2009, 3 October.
 R.Valihnovsky Klіnіchny dosvіd vikoristannya dozovanoї dermotenzії in patsієntіv s Nabutov Vadamee oblichchya // Óêðà¿íñüêèé medichny chasopis: magazine. - 2009. - T. X / XI. - No. 5 (73).
 R.Valihnovsky Suchasna Look at bazovі fun- formuvannya lіkuvalno-dіagnostichnogo standard in rekonstruktivnіy hіrurgії Nabutov wad oblichchya - Progressive rozvitok tehnіchnogo aspect // Liky Ukraine: the magazine. - 2009. - No. 8 (134).
 R.Valihnovsky method of surgical treatment of alopecia adrogenozavisimoy: patent. - 2005. - No. 02622.
 R.Valihnovsky method of surgical treatment of alopecia: a patent. - 2005. - No. 04067.

References

Links 
Офіційний вебсайт
 Rostislav Valihnovsky: "I've always started from scratch», 6 May 2008
 Valihnovsky: "In Ukraine, every day from medical errors is dying 9-12 people», 4 November 2010
The newspaper "Today": "The reception was at best doctor: Rostislav Valihnovski - Plastic Surgeon", 27 July 2014

1973 births
Living people
Physicians from Ivano-Frankivsk
Ukrainian surgeons
Religious leaders from Ivano-Frankivsk
Politicians from Ivano-Frankivsk